St Joseph's Convent High School, Adilabad, is a Christian minority institution run by the Sisters of the Destitute Educational Society, Adilabad. The school, situated at the district headquarters of Adilabad, began on 14 November 1964.

Education

St Joseph's Convent High School instructs students up to the 10th standard and prepares students for the SSC (Class 10) Matriculation Examination. The medium of instruction is English. Electives and clubs offered include Religion and Moral Science, Communications, Drama, General Knowledge (Debate), Dance, Art, Music, among many others.

History

It was started at the request of the District Collector, Shri Rajamani, IAS and the Superintendent of Police, Shri Subramaniam, IPS. They felt the need for an English Medium School, run by Catholics, in the backward areas. They approached Bishop Januarius CMI with a request to create the school. He put forward the matter to Mother General, Mother Rose Mary SD.

The land required for the establishment of the school was provided by Government and on 14 November 1964 the school came into existence. In 1979 the school was given permanent recognition by the Andhra Pradesh Government.

Principals

See also
Education in India
Matriculation
Tenth Grade 
List of schools in India
List of institutions of higher education in Telangana

References

External links 

Catholic secondary schools in India
Private schools in Telangana
Christian schools in Telangana
Adilabad district
Educational institutions established in 1964
1964 establishments in Andhra Pradesh